The Shanghai International Gymnastic Center is a basketball arena, in Changning District, Shanghai, China. The arena holds 4,000 people.

It is currently used mostly for Artistic gymnastics events.

References 

Indoor arenas in China
Sports venues in Shanghai